Nasmah is a settlement in the former Mizda district of Libya. The village is at 31° 23' N, 13° 17' E. The tribe that populates the area is known as the "Awlad Abu seif".

Populated places in Jabal al Gharbi District